Abu Bakr al-Isfahani (born in Isfahan – died 908 CE in Baghdad), popularly known as Al-Isfahani (from Isfahan), was a Persian Quran reciter who specialized in Warsh recitation.

Biography
Abu Bakr Al-Isfahani was an imam in Warsh recitation.

He departed from Isfahan in order to learn the Warsh recitation to Cairo in Egypt, where he read to Warsh students.

Then he settled in the city of Baghdad, so he was the first Quran Qari who introduced the Warsh recitation to Iraq, and people took it from him until the people of Iraq did not know this Qiraat without his way, and therefore it was attributed to him there without mentioning one of his Egyptian sheikhs.

Teachers
Abu Bakr Al-Isfahani took the Warsh recitation from many of the Imam Warsh's students in Cairo, including:
 Abu al-Rabie al-Rashedini.
 Abu al-Achaath al-Jarashi.
 Abu al-Qasim al-Muafiri.
 Ibn Masud al-Madani.

He took other knowledge from other imams, including:
 .
 Abdullah ibn Omar ibn Aban.

See also 
 Warsh
 Warsh recitation

References 

Hadith studies
Quran reciters
908 deaths
Warsh recitation
Hadith scholars
Quran reciting
Quranic readings
Year of birth missing